Télesphore St. Arnaud (15 December 1870 – 15 January 1948) was a provincial politician from Alberta, Canada. He served as a member of the Legislative Assembly of Alberta from 1921 to 1926 sitting with the United Farmers caucus in government.

Political career
St. Arnaud ran for a seat to the Legislature in the 1921 Alberta general election. He defeated Liberal incumbent Lucien Boudreau in a straight fight to pick up the St. Albert electoral district for the United Farmers. He did not run for re-election and retired at dissolution of the assembly in 1926.

References

External links
Legislative Assembly of Alberta Members Listing

Franco-Albertan people
United Farmers of Alberta MLAs
People from Mauricie
1867 births
1948 deaths